The Central Station (also known as the Sebring Fire Station) is a historic site in Sebring, Florida, United States. It is located at 301 North Mango Street. The architect was William J Heim and it was built in 1927. It is an example of Art Deco style. On August 14, 1989, it was added to the U.S. National Register of Historic Places.

References

External links

 

Fire stations completed in 1927
Buildings and structures in Sebring, Florida
Fire stations on the National Register of Historic Places in Florida
National Register of Historic Places in Highlands County, Florida
1927 establishments in Florida